Slavko Vlahović (Cyrillic: Славко Влаховић; born 7 June 1954) is a former Yugoslav and Montenegrin footballer who played as a defender.

Club career
He spent the majority of his career at Budućnost Titograd, becoming the club's most capped player ever. With 413 appearances, between 1977 and 1991, Vlahović is also the second-most capped player in Yugoslav First League history, only behind Enver Marić.

References

External links
 
 

1954 births
Living people
People from Kula, Serbia
Yugoslav footballers
Association football defenders
FK Crvenka players
FK Budućnost Podgorica players
Yugoslav First League players